DeVries Glacier is a steep tributary glacier just east of Peckham Glacier, flowing from the south slopes of the Britannia Range into Byrd Glacier. It was named by the Advisory Committee on Antarctic Names for Arthur L. DeVries, a United States Antarctic Research Program biologist at McMurdo Station in the 1961–62 and 1963–64 summer seasons.

References 

Glaciers of Oates Land